Signalness Creek is a stream in Pope County, in the U.S. state of Minnesota.

Signalness Creek was named for Olaus Signalness, a Norwegian settler.

See also
List of rivers of Minnesota

References

Rivers of Pope County, Minnesota
Rivers of Minnesota